The Football League Third Division North Cup was a football knockout competition open to teams competing in Football League Third Division North. The competition was first held in 1933–34 and ran until the 1938–39 season. The cup was revived for the 1945–46 season. This was a parallel competition to the Football League Third Division South Cup.

Format
The competition was run using a knockout format, with games replayed if level. In the first year the tournament format resulted in 11 first round ties, followed by 4 second round ties (with three byes), and 3 third round matches (with one bye). In most seasons there were minor changes to the format, resulting in differing numbers of ties (and byes) in each round. The tournaments featured all 22 teams from Division Three North, with the exception of the final season, when only 14 teams played in the competition. The final was played on the home ground of one of the two finalists.

The 1945–46 competition started with two cup competitions, the Third Division North (East) Cup and Third Division North (West) Cup. Each cup consisted of 10 teams played on a league basis, although only 10 games were played by each team. The first 8 places in each cup then contested the first round of a two legged knockout competition.

Finals
The result of each year's final is given in the table below.

See also
Football League Third Division South Cup
Football League Trophy

References

Defunct football cup competitions in England
Cup
Defunct English Football League competitions